Paradise is the eleventh studio album by saxophonist Kenny G. It was released by Arista Records in 2002, and reached number 2 on the Contemporary Jazz Albums chart, number 9 on the Billboard 200 and Internet Albums charts and number 15 on the R&B/Hip-Hop Albums chart.

Track listing
"Brazil" (Kenny G/Walter Afanasieff) - 4:37
"Paradise" (Kenny G/Walter Afanasieff) - 4:16
"Malibu Dreams" (Kenny G/Walter Afanasieff) - 5:07
"One More Time" (featuring Chanté Moore) (Walter Afanasieff) - 4:13
"Spanish Nights" (Kenny G/Walter Afanasieff) - 6:11
"Seaside Jam" (Kenny G/Walter Afanasieff) - 4:52
"Ocean Breeze" (Kenny G/Walter Afanasieff) - 4:39
"Falling in the Moonlight" (Kenny G/Walter Afanasieff) - 5:15
"All the Way" (featuring Brian McKnight) (Brian McKnight) - 4:18
"Midnight Magic" (Kenny G/Walter Afanasieff) - 5:17
"Peace" (Kenny G/Walter Afanasieff) - 3:43
"Harmony" (Kenny G/Walter Afanasieff) - 4:40 (Japan)
"Casablanca" (John Healy/Higgins/Limbo) - 4:17 (bonus track)

Personnel 
 Kenny G – arrangements (1, 2, 3, 5-8, 11), soprano saxophone (1-9, 11), tenor saxophone (10)
 Walter Afanasieff – arrangements (1-8, 10, 11), keyboard and rhythm programming (1-8, 10, 11), Hammond B3 organ (10)
 Josh Binder – programming (1, 2, 3, 5-8, 11)
 Frank Maranzino – programming (1-5, 7, 8, 11)
 Brian McKnight – instruments (9), lead and backing vocals (9)
 Greg Phillinganes – keyboards (10)
 Randy Waldman – acoustic piano (10)
 Heitor Pereum – nylon guitar (1)
 Michael Landau – electric guitar (2, 3, 4, 6, 8)
 Ramon Stagnaro – nylon guitar (5)
 Phil Upchurch – guitar (10)
 Alex Al – bass (10)
 Donnell Spencer – drums (10)
 Jorge Calandrelli – orchestra arrangements and conductor (1, 11)
 William Ross – orchestra arrangements and conductor (2-8)
 Debbie Datz-Pyle – orchestra contractor (1-8, 11)
 Matthew Della Polla – orchestra consultant (2, 4, 5)
 Chanté Moore – lead and backing vocals (4)

Production 
 Producers – Kenny G (tracks 1, 2, 3, 5-8 & 11, co-producer on track 9 ); Walter Afanasieff (tracks 1-8, 10 & 11); Brian McKnight (track 9).
 Executive Producer – Antonio "L.A." Reid
 Production Coordination on tracks 1-8, 10 & 11 – Rich Davis
 Engineers – Humberto Gatica (tracks 1-8, 10 & 11); David Reiztas (tracks 1-5, 8 & 11); Steve Shepherd (tracks 1-5, 8 & 11); Nick Thomas (tracks 1-5, 8 & 11); Chris Wood (track 9).
 Second Engineer – Paul Wertheimer (tracks 1-8 & 11).
 Additional Engineering – Chris Brooke (tracks 1 & 4)
 Assistant Engineers – Brian Dixon (tracks 1-8, 10 & 11); Nick Marshall (tracks 1-5, 7, 8 & 11); Jason Rankins (tracks 1, 2, 5, 8 & 10); Chris Brooke (tracks 2, 4 & 10); Mary Ann Souza (track 9); Steve Jenewick (track 11).
 Recorded at WallyWorld Studios (Marin County, CA); Studio G (Seattle, WA); Signet Sound Studios (Los Angeles, CA); Backroom Studios (Glendale, CA).
 Orchestra on tracks 1-8 & 11 engineered by Humberto Gatica at Paramount Studios (Hollywood, CA).
 Pro Tools Engineering – Jason Wolmouth (tracks 1-8, 10 & 11); Bill Smith (track 3).
 Mixing – Humberto Gatica (tracks 1, 2, 5-8, 10 & 11); Al Schmitt (track 3); Mick Guzauski (tracks 4 & 9).
 Mix Assistants – Chris Brooke (tracks 1, 2, 5-8, 10 & 11); Steve Sheppard (tracks 2 & 5); Tom Bender (tracks 4 & 9).
 Mixed at Westlake Studios (Los Angeles, CA); Capitol Studios (Hollywood, CA); Barking Doctor Studios (Mount Kisco, NY).
 Mastered by Vlado Meller at Sony Music Studios (New York City, NY).
 Technicians on tracks 1, 2, 3, 6, 7, 8 & 11 – Norm Dulgatch and Dominic Gonzales
 Creative Director – Joe Mama-Nitzberg
 Art Direction and Design – Courtney Walter
 Photography – Herb Ritts
 Management – Dennis Turner at Turner Management Group, Inc.

Year-end charts

Certifications

References

External links
 Artist Direct album page
 [ Charts & Awards] at Allmusic

2002 albums
Arista Records albums
Kenny G albums
Albums produced by Brian McKnight
Albums produced by Walter Afanasieff